Achuthanand Tanjore Ravi (born 22 June 1991, in Chennai, India) is an Indian Photographer known for his Photojournalism and Portraiture Photography. His works has been published and has been exhibited at various galleries and museums across India.

Career 

Achuthanand began his photojournalism career in 2008 and has spent years working as a freelance photojournalist for agencies nationally and internationally. His photography has taken him to many places in and around India in search of breaking news and documentary material. He is a self-taught photographer and learnt various techniques by attending various workshops by top photojournalist and with the help of the internet. Achuthanand founded the group named as Madras in Motion, a platform for budding photographers along with the help of his friend Ashok Kumar

Awards and recognition

Achuthanand has received recognition for this photographic images, including for "Mahakumbh Mela-2013", a photo documentary on the mahakumbh festival and "Beyond sight", a photo documentary on visually challenged people. He received a grant from UNESCO for this work.

References

External links 
The Hindu-Achuthanand Tanjore Ravi
New Indian Express-Achuthanand Tanjore Ravi
Deccan Herald-Achuthanand Tanjore Ravi
TED X-Achuthanand Tanjore Ravi
Metropolis in focus – Achuthanand
Deccan Chronicle – Achuthanand Ravi
Myriad faces of kumbh – Deccan Chronicle

Indian photojournalists
Indian male journalists
Artists from Chennai
1991 births
Living people